The Africa Squadron was a unit of the United States Navy that operated from 1819 to 1861 in the Blockade of Africa to suppress the slave trade along the coast of West Africa.  However, the term was often ascribed generally to anti-slavery operations during the period leading up to the American Civil War.

The squadron was an outgrowth of the 1819 treaty between the United States and the United Kingdom that was an early step in stopping the trade, and further defined by the Webster–Ashburton Treaty of 1842. Although technically coordinated with a British West Africa Squadron based in Sierra Leone, in practice the American contingent worked on its own.

Matthew Perry was the first commander of the squadron, and based himself in Portuguese Cape Verde.

The squadron was generally ineffective, since the ships were too few, and since much of the trading activity had shifted to the Niger River delta area (present-day Nigeria), which was not being covered. In the two years of Perry's leadership, only one slaver was reported to have been captured, and that ship was later acquitted by a New Orleans court. In the 16 years of squadron operation, only the crews of 19 slave ships went to trial.  These slavers were acquitted or only lightly fined. Other commanders, however, were more successful.

African slave trade patrol

The Africa Squadron's cruising area eventually ranged from Cape Frio to the south (about 18 degrees south latitude), to Madeira in the north. The navy department did not move the depot location until 1859, when it was set up at São Paulo de Luanda, in Portuguese Angola, about eight degrees south latitude. At the same time the department put Madeira out of bounds for the squadron.

The majority of the squadron's cruising in its first decade was along the coast of Western Africa, with particular attention to Liberian interests.  By the 1850s much of the slave trade in this area had been eliminated by the British, based in their colony at Sierra Leone, as well as the Liberians.

Vessels seized

Africa Squadron

Source: Canney, D.L., Africa Squadron, Potomac Books, 2006, pp. 233–234

See also
Pacific Squadron
Home Squadron
West Indies Squadron
Mediterranean Squadron
Brazil Squadron
North Atlantic Squadron
East India Squadron

References
 Richard Andrew Lobban Jr. and Peter Karibe Mendy, Historical Dictionary of the Republic of Guinea-Bissau, 3rd ed. (Scarecrow Press, 1997 ) pp. 66–68
 

 

Slavery in Africa
United States Navy in the 19th century
Ship squadrons of the United States Navy
19th century in Africa
Military units and formations established in the 1840s
1843 establishments in the United States
Military units and formations disestablished in 1861
Abolitionism in Africa
Anti-slavery military operations